Moses Molongo (Russian: Мозес Молонго born 14 June 1979 in Cameroon) is a Cameroonian retired international footballer. He played for Victoria United Limbe aka Opopo as number 9 and was the team Captain where he represented the national colours of Cameroon before starting his international career in football.

Career

Russia

Sighted at SKA-Khabarovsk's camp in China preceding 2002/03, Molongo ended up not impressing.

Ukraine

Chipping in with two goals in three friendlies while at Vorskla Poltava's camp, and earning the praise of Vitaliy Kvartsyanyi, he officially became part of their squad leading up to spring 2003.

Poland

Donning the colours of Rega Trzebiatów in 2005, the Cameroonian left later that year. Due to this, Rega did not have a regular goalscorer which was a corollary of his departure. The former Zagłębie Lubin man then spent 2006 with Stal Mielec and returned to Rega leading up to 2008 before taking up a contract with Sławy Sławno where he chalked up three goals to see off Pogoń Barlinek 4-0.

References

External links 
 У пошуках екс-“ворсклян”. Мойзес Молонго
 90minut Profile

Living people
Ząbkovia Ząbki players
FC Volyn Lutsk players
FC Vorskla Poltava players
ŠK Slovan Bratislava players
Slovak Super Liga players
ŁKS Łódź players
Stal Mielec players
Stilon Gorzów Wielkopolski players
Cameroonian expatriate footballers
Association football forwards
1979 births
Zagłębie Lubin players
Ekstraklasa players
FC SKA-Khabarovsk players
SFC Opava players
FC Hoverla Uzhhorod players
Cwmbrân Town A.F.C. players
Cameroonian footballers
Expatriate footballers in Poland
Expatriate footballers in Russia
Expatriate footballers in Slovakia
Expatriate footballers in Wales
Expatriate footballers in Ukraine
Expatriate footballers in the Czech Republic
Cameroonian expatriate sportspeople in Poland
Cameroonian expatriate sportspeople in Russia
Cameroonian expatriate sportspeople in Slovakia
Cameroonian expatriate sportspeople in Wales
Cameroonian expatriate sportspeople in Ukraine
Cameroonian expatriate sportspeople in the Czech Republic